Oak Futures, or Oak Futures Ltd, were a proprietary trading and electronic market making firm based in City of London, United Kingdom. A Regional Office was located in Bromley, Greater London.

Oak Futures Ltd

History
The firm was founded in 2009 by Steve J. Roberts and Julian B. Cowley; former International Petroleum Exchange traders in London.

Description

The firm's business areas incorporated proprietary trading and electronic market making, and specializes in the trading of Financial Futures and Energy Futures across multiple electronic exchanges including Chicago Mercantile Exchange, NYMEX, IntercontinentalExchange and NYSE Euronext and Eurex.  In total the firm had connectivity to over 70 global electronic futures exchanges through multiple trading platforms including those from Trading Technologies, IntercontinentalExchange, Stellar Trading Systems and CQG.

The firm specialised in Energy Trading Products predominantly Brent Crude Oil, West Texas Intermediate Crude Oil, Gas Oil, Oman Crude Oil, Emissions and Heating Oil.

Office Locations

Oak Futures Ltd Headquarters was in the City of London, Cheapside.  The firm also had regional office in Bromley, Greater London.

Operations

The firm utilised ULL (Ultra Low Latency) feeds from multiple electronic exchanges located worldwide.  These ULL feeds powered their trading technology applications providing DMA (Direct Market Access) coverage across the globe.  All products and exchange connectivity was supported by a London-based Electronic Trading Support team.

Company Images

{|
|

References

External links
 Official Website

Financial services companies established in 2009
Companies based in the City of London